The Inter Faith Network, fully known as The Inter Faith Network for the United Kingdom, is a registered charity that works with its member bodies "to advance public knowledge and mutual understanding of the teachings, traditions and practices of different faith communities in Britain and to promote good relations between persons of different faiths." It was formed in 1987 and registered as a charity in 1997.

History 
The Inter Faith Network works with faith communities, interfaith organizations, educators, and others to understanding of different religious and spiritual traditions across the United Kingdom. The IFN initially recognized only a few religious traditions, though gradually this was expanded to include additional faiths, including Druidry through its acceptance of The Druid Network as a religion in 2014.

References

External links 
   The Inter Faith Network for the United Kingdom

Non-profit organisations based in the United Kingdom
Interfaith organizations